Josephine Leavell Allensworth (1855–1938) was an American musician, music teacher, and activist. She co-founded Allensworth, California and the Women's Improvement League.

Early life
Josephine Leavell was born in Trenton, Kentucky, in 1855. She married Allen Allensworth in 1877. He was an African-American Baptist minister in the United States Army. They had two daughters, one named Nella. The family lived in Fort Supply, Oklahoma, and Fort William Henry Harrison in Montana. Leavell would play the organ when Allensworth would host services.

Founding of Women's Improvement League

Allen Allensworth would retire in 1906. They founded Allensworth, California. While living in Allensworth, Leavell founded the Women's Improvement League. She also provided the land for the founding of the Mary Dickinson Memorial Library. The founding of the library developed out of a library being approved by the Allensworth Board of Trustees. The reading room they approved was too small for the community. Leavell therefore created the property to develop larger land for a larger library. The library is named after her mother and was completed in July 1913. The building of the library cost $500. It could hold 1,000 books. The Allensworths donated their personal book collection to the library. She was also a school board member.

In 1914, Allen Allensworth was killed by a motorcyclist in Monrovia, California.

In 1922, Leavell moved to Los Angeles to live with her daughter, Nella, who was married to Louis Blogett. As a resident in Los Angeles, Leavell fought for racial integration in swimming pools and other venues.

Death and legacy

Leavell lived in Los Angeles until her death in 1938. Allensworth is now a California State Historic Park: Colonel Allensworth State Historic Park.

Further reading

Bunch, Lonnie. "Josephine Leavell Allensworth." Black Women in America: A Historical Encyclopedia. Brooklyn: Carlson Publishing (1992). pp. 22–23

References

1855 births
1938 deaths
20th-century American musicians
American music educators
American women music educators
People from Tulare County, California
People from Todd County, Kentucky
American organists
Musicians from Los Angeles
Musicians from Kentucky
Women organists
20th-century women musicians
20th-century American women musicians
African-American women musicians
20th-century African-American women
20th-century African-American people
20th-century African-American musicians